Enamel hypocalcification is a defect of tooth enamel in which normal amounts of enamel are produced but are hypomineralized. In this defect the enamel is softer than normal. Some areas in enamel are hypocalcified: enamel spindles, enamel tufts, and enamel lamellae.

Causal factors may occur locally, affecting only a single tooth, or they may act systemically, affecting all teeth in which enamel is being formed. Local trauma or abscess formation can adversely affect the ameloblasts overlying a developing crown, resulting in enamel hypocalcification or hypoplasia. Affected teeth may have areas of coronal discoloration, or they
may have actual pits and irregularities. This is most commonly seen in permanent teeth in which the overlying deciduous tooth becomes abscessed or is physically forced into the enamel organ of the permanent tooth. The resulting hypoplastic or hypocalcified permanent tooth is sometimes known as Turner's tooth.

References 

Dental enamel
Developmental tooth pathology